The Beretta 8000 (Cougar) series pistols are manufactured by Beretta of Italy.

They first appeared on the market in 1994 as a more compact alternative to the full-sized Beretta 92 service pistol in order to offer a compromise between concealability, ease of carry, accuracy and firepower.

Originally developed for the .40 S&W cartridge, which was a new cartridge at the time, it was later also manufactured for other calibers, such as 9×19 mm,  .357 SIG and .45 ACP. These pistols are suitable for use by police and for civilian self-defense.

Description

Cougar 8000 series pistols are recoil-operated, locked breech semi-automatic pistols. These pistols use a relatively rare rotating barrel locking system, in which the barrel rotates on recoil to unlock itself from the slide. The rotating motion of the barrel is controlled by the stud on its bottom, which follows the cam track in the steel frame insert.

The frame is made from lightweight aluminum alloy. The basic version of the Cougar pistol is the F model, with double-action trigger with exposed hammer, and ambidextrous safety/decocker levers, located on the slide. Alternative is D version, which is double-action only, and thus have spurless hammer and no safety/decocker levers. Cougar pistols use double-stack magazines in 9 mm, .357 SIG and .40 caliber models, and staggered column magazines in .45 caliber models.

Variants
The 8000 series is available in several calibers and in either "F", "G" or "D" configuration.

Calibers 
8000: 9×19 mm, 15-round magazine capacity
8000F: .41 AE
8000L: 9×19 mm, lighter, more compact, 13-round magazine capacity
8000L Type P: 9×19 mm, lighter, more compact, 15-round magazine capacity
8357: .357 SIG, 11-round magazine capacity
8040: .40 S&W, 11-round magazine capacity
8045: .45 ACP, 8-round magazine capacity

European models were offered in .41 Action Express and 9×21mm.

F configuration 
The F specification is the basic version with double-action trigger, exposed hammer, and ambidextrous safety/decocking levers (located on the slide).

D configuration 
The D specification is double-action only ("DAO") with a spurless hammer and no safety/decocking levers.

G configuration 
The G specification is a DA/SA variant with a "decock" only feature. It features an exposed hammer with ambidextrous decocking levers (on the slide). There is no safety on this model.

T configuration 
The T specification includes a tactical rail.

Mini Cougar 
The 8000, 8040 and 8045 are available in a Mini variant weighing 140 g less than the respective models and with a grip that is 25 mm shorter.  The slide and barrel are the same length as the full size pistols. This variant is available in the "D" and "F" configurations.

Inox 
Some models are available as an Inox version which has a stainless steel slide, barrel and other components.

8045 Cougar 
The 8045 Beretta Cougar was produced between 1998–2004 in the D and F configuration. A Mini 8045 Cougar was also produced in the same configurations. No factory 8045 Cougars were produced in the "G" configuration, but prototype Cougars do exist in the G configuration as well as with a light rail.

8045 Cat Pack 

In 1999, Beretta USA offered 2000 special edition kits to accompany the 8045F Cougar. Accompanying the basic 8045F was a kit consisting of a special edition case, lapel pin and charcoal laminate grips with inlaid cougar medallions. The pistol comes in the 8045F model which is a double/single-action-type pistol. Standard white dot sights and factory black plastic grips are standard with the "Pak" consisting of the case, wood grips and pin.

8045 LAPD 

Beretta USA made an 8045F for the Los Angeles Police Department. One requirement of the LAPD using these firearms was the use of a 4-inch barrel. There were a limited number of these longer barrels produced to meet this need. Some barrels were shipped to the LAPD to be added and some were shipped directly from the factory already assembled in the pistols. However, BUSA had offered these barrels for sale to military/law enforcement officers for $198 only for a brief period. Some of these pistols were converted to a "G" model (decock only) by various agencies but were not offered in this configuration from Beretta USA.

Stoeger Cougar 
Marketing and distribution of the Cougar has been transferred to Stoeger Industries, a subsidiary of Beretta.  The firearms are made in Turkey, using Beretta factory tooling.  Stoeger now produces Cougars in 9×19mm, .45 ACP, and .40 S&W.  Stoeger recently added a more compact-sized Cougar pistol to their production line, currently available in 9×19mm only.  The Cougar Compact has a reduced magazine capacity of 13 rounds and MSRP is US$50 less than its full-size counterpart.

Users

  - since 2007 used as service pistol in private security companies

- North Carolina Highway Patrol used the Model 8357 357 SIG, Los Angeles Police Department authorizes the weapon for duty carry, Utah Highway Patrol issued the Model 8040 in .40 S&W, as well as some city and sheriffs agencies throughout the country. The New York City Police Department still authorizes the 8000D (double action only) variant for off-duty and backup carry, but as the pistol must be in new condition and manufactured by Beretta, the pistol is slowly aging out of use as no new pistols are being manufactured, and therefore cannot be acquired by new officers.

References

External links
Stoeger Turkey, manufacturer of Stoeger Cougar
Review of Stoeger Cougar
Stoeger Cougar official website. 
Ballistics By The Inch test data for the Beretta 8045
User Manual

Beretta firearms
8000
.357 SIG semi-automatic pistols
.40 S&W semi-automatic pistols
.41 Action Express semi-automatic pistols
.45 ACP semi-automatic pistols
9mm Parabellum semi-automatic pistols